Acrolophus capex is a moth of the family Acrolophidae. It is found in Colombia.

References

capex
Moths described in 1921